The climax (from the Greek word κλῖμαξ, meaning "staircase" and "ladder") or turning point of a narrative work is its point of highest tension and drama, or it is the time when the action starts during which the solution is given. The climax of a story is a literary element.

Examples 
The punch line of a joke is an analogy for the climax of a fictional narrative, though the absence of any falling action is an essential difference, which may reflect the nature of humor as opposed to the nature of drama.

In non-fictional narrative genres, even though the author does not have the same freedom to control the action and "plot" as in works of fiction, the selection of subject matter, degree of detail, and emphasis permit an author to create similar structures, i.e., to construct a dramatization.

In the play Hippolytus, by Greek playwright Euripides, the climax arrives when Phaedra hears Hippolytus react badly because of her love for him. That is the moment that Aphrodite's curse is finally fulfilled, and it is the turning point of the play.

Anticlimax 
An anticlimax is a situation in a plot in which something which would appear to be difficult to solve is solved through something trivial. For example, destroying a heavily guarded facility would require advanced technology, teamwork, and weaponry for a climax, but for an anticlimax, it may just require pushing a red button which reads, "Emergency Self-Destruct", or simply filling out an eviction notice and destroying the building. An example is the ending of The War of the Worlds, where amidst the chaos of the extraterrestrial takeover of planet Earth, the aliens are defeated by the most unexpected organism: the common cold virus. Another example could involve the protagonist faced with insurmountable odds and ultimately being killed without accomplishing his goal, despite what appears to be a turning point for the character.

The deus ex machina is a form of anticlimax, where an unseen and completely unrelated outside influence enters the story and solves the central problem.

See also 
 Dramatic structure
 Literary element
 Climax as a rhetorical device

References 

Narratology
Fiction
Plot (narrative)